Gaby Jean (born 19 February 2000) is a French professional footballer who plays as a centre-back for Annecy.

Career
Jean is a youth product of the academies of Dijon and Montceau. He began his senior career with Montceau in the Championnat National 3 in 2019, and moved to Louhans-Cuiseaux in 2020. He transferred to the newly promoted Ligue 2 club Annecy in 20 July 2022. He made his professional debut with Annecy in a 2–1 Ligue 2 loss to Niort on 30 July 2022.

References

External links
 

2000 births
Living people
Sportspeople from Mâcon
French footballers
FC Montceau Bourgogne players
Louhans-Cuiseaux FC players
FC Annecy players
Ligue 2 players
Championnat National 2 players
Championnat National 3 players
Association football defenders
Footballers from Bourgogne-Franche-Comté